Chamarande is a commune of Essonne department in the southern suburbs of Paris.

Inhabitants of Chamarande are known as Chamarandais.

History
Initially, this village was named Bonnes. In 1685, d'Ornaison family, the owner of the village and its château, gained permission from the French king to change the name to Chamarande.  A later owner, the Duc de Persigny, was Minister of the Interior under Napoléon III and a financial backer of the building of the Paris-Orléans rail station in the village, today an RER C station.

Geography
The Juine forms the commune's eastern border.

See also
Communes of the Essonne department

References

External links
 The Château de Chamarande on the French Wikipedia 
  Official website of Chamarande 

Mayors of Essonne Association 

Communes of Essonne